Tectona philippinensis, also called Philippine teak, is a species of plant in the family Lamiaceae, formerly classified in the Verbenaceae. It is endemic to the Philippines. The species is endangered due to land conversion and logging for its timber.

References

Lamiaceae
Endemic flora of the Philippines
Taxonomy articles created by Polbot